Coventry Reform Jewish Community, a member of the Movement for Reform Judaism,  is a Reform Judaism congregation in Coventry, West Midlands, England.

See also
 List of Jewish communities in the United Kingdom
 Movement for Reform Judaism

References

External links
 The Movement for Reform Judaism
 Coventry Reform Jewish Community on Jewish Communities and Records – UK (hosted by jewishgen.org)

Coventry
Reform synagogues in the United Kingdom